Cristo Rey Jesuit High School is a private, Roman Catholic high school located in the Phillips neighborhood of Minneapolis, Minnesota, United States, in the Roman Catholic Archdiocese of Saint Paul and Minneapolis. It was founded by the Society of Jesus in 2007 and is one of over 36 high schools in the country which follow the Cristo Rey work-study model of education for students from low-income families.

Background
Cristo Rey Jesuit High School opened in August 2007 and saw its first students graduate in 2011.  It is part of the Cristo Rey Network of high schools, the original being Cristo Rey Jesuit High School in Chicago. In October 2017, the school had 117 corporate partners who were ready to employ students through the Cristo Rey Work Study Program.

Spirituals 
Students make day-long retreats in the first three years and in their senior year they make a 3-day Kairos retreat. Three days each week the entire school participates in the 5-minute daily examen practice, which grew out of Ignatian retreats.

Service requirement 
In order to graduate, students are required to complete at least 40 hours of volunteer service and one long-term or large-scale project. Service hours and project can be completed during school hours and outside of school.

Extra-curricular activities

Sports 
 Boys' and girls' basketball
 Boys' and girls' soccer
 Girls' volleyball
 Boys' and girls' track and field
 Baseball
 Softball

Activities 
 Art
 Chess Club
 Choir
 Dance
 Junior Achievement Business Club
 One Act Play
 Robotics
 Spring Musical
 Student Government
 Student Ambassadors (PAWS)

References

Further reading
 Kearney, G. R. More Than a Dream: The Cristo Rey Story: How One School's Vision Is Changing the World. Chicago, Ill: Loyola Press, 2008.

External links
 School website
 Cristo Rey Network
 Fr. John P. Foley honored with Presidential Citizen's Medal
60 minutes
Cristo Rey Featured in WashPost column by George Will
 Boston Globe - With sense of purpose, students cut class for a day 
 Bill & Melinda Gates Foundation - Success of Innovative Urban Catholic School Sparks Major Investment

Cristo Rey Network
Educational institutions established in 2007
High schools in Minneapolis
Jesuit high schools in the United States
Catholic secondary schools in Minnesota
Roman Catholic Archdiocese of Saint Paul and Minneapolis
Poverty-related organizations
2007 establishments in Minnesota